Zanichelli editore S.p.A. is an Italian publishing company founded in Modena, Italy, in 1859.

It publishes mainly textbooks for school, university and professional books (legal texts and medicine), dictionaries, and reference books.

History
It has been based in Bologna since 1866. It was the first to translate into Italian Charles Darwin's On the Origin of Species (1864) and Relativity: The Special and the General Theory by Albert Einstein (1921).

References

External links
 Zanichelli official website

1859 establishments in Italy
book distributors
book publishing companies of Italy
bookshops of Italy
companies based in Bologna
Italian brands
Italian companies established in 1859
publishing companies established in 1859
publishing companies of Italy